Abdolabad or Abdol Abad may refer to:

Alborz Province
 Abdolabad, Alborz, a village in Nazarabad County

East Azerbaijan Province
 Abdolabad, East Azerbaijan, a village in Malekan County
 Abdolabad, Sarab, a village in Sarab County

Fars Province
Abdolabad, Arsanjan, a village in Arsanjan County
Abdolabad, Sepidan, a village in Sepidan County

Hamadan Province
 Abdolabad, Hamadan, a village in Kabudarahang County

Isfahan Province
 Abdolabad, Isfahan, a village in Buin va Miandasht County

Kerman Province
 Abdolabad, Bardsir, a village in Bardsir County
 Abdolabad, Lalehzar, a village in Bardsir County
 Abdolabad, Jiroft, a village in Jiroft County
 Abdolabad, Kerman, a village in Kerman County
 Abdolabad, Narmashir, a village in Narmashir County
 Abdolabad, Rafsanjan, a village in Rafsanjan County
 Abdolabad, Rudbar-e Jonubi, a village in Rudbar-e Jonubi County
 Abdolabad, Shahr-e Babak, a village in Shahr-e Babak County
 Abdolabad, Zarand, a village in Zarand County
 Abdolabad, Vahdat, a village in Zarand County

Kurdistan Province
 Abdolabad, Kurdistan, a village in Qorveh County

Lorestan Province
 Abdolabad, Selseleh, a village in Selseleh County
 Abdolabad-e Kani Kabud, a village in Delfan County

North Khorasan Province
 Abdolabad, alternate name of Abdollahabad, Garmkhan, a village in Bojnord County

Qazvin Province
 Abdolabad, Abyek, a village in Abyek County
 Abdolabad, Qazvin, a village in Qazvin County

Qom
 Abdolabad-e Pain, in Qom County

Razavi Khorasan Province
 Abdolabad, Bardaskan, a village in Bardaskan County
 Abdolabad, Firuzeh, a village in Firuzeh County
 Abdolabad, Joghatai, a village in Joghatai County
 Abdolabad, Khoshab, a village in Khoshab County
 Abdolabad, Mahvelat, a village in Mahvelat County
 Abdolabad, Mashhad, a village in Mashhad County
 Abdolabad, Nishapur, a village in Nishapur County
 Abdol Abad, Torbat-e Heydarieh, a village in Torbat-e Heydarieh County
 Abdolabad, Torbat-e Jam, a village in Torbat-e Jam County

Semnan Province
 Abdolabad, Semnan, in Damghan County
 Abdolabad, Amirabad, in Damghan County

Tehran Province
 Abdolabad, Tehran, a village in Pakdasht County
 Abdolabad-e Gardaneh, a village in Rey County

West Azerbaijan Province
 Abdolabad, Maku, a village in Maku County
 Abdolabad, West Azerbaijan, a village in Salmas County

See also
 Abdalabad (disambiguation)